CTX is a three-letter abbreviation with multiple meanings:

Programmer and Mapper
 Скаммер на скины, на ножы кидает. Токсик -rep

Medical 
 C-terminal telopeptide, a blood serum biomarker that can be measured to assess bone turnover
 Ceftriaxone, an antibiotic
Cefotaxime, an antibiotic
 Cerebrotendineous xanthomatosis, a genetic disorder
 Charybdotoxin, a toxin found in scorpion venom
 Chemotherapy, treatment of cancer with cytotoxic drugs
 Cholera toxin, a toxin responsible for the harmful effects of cholera
 Ciguatoxin, a neurotoxin produced by marine dinoflagellates
 Conotoxin, a toxin found in cone snail venom
 Crotoxin, toxic compound in snake venom
 Cyclophosphamide, an anticancer drug

Technology 
 Centrex, a telephone service
 Citrix Systems, company best known for desktop virtualization software
 CTX (camera), on the Mars Reconnaissance Orbiter
 CTX (computer virus)
 CTX (explosive-detection device)
 Collisionless Terrella Experiment, a levitated dipole at Columbia University

Business 
 Caltex, where CTX is the stock symbol for Caltex Australia Limited
 CTX (Carbon Trade Exchange)

Others 
 Concordia University Texas, where 'C' is for Concordia and 'TX' is for Texas
 Countdown to Extinction, a thrill ride at Disney's Animal Kingdom, now known as DINOSAUR
 CTX, IATA airport code for the city of Cortland, New York, U.S.A.